"Jealous Heart" was Máire Brennan's second solo single, taken from her album Máire released the same year. The cover features a photograph by the Douglas Brothers. A promotional video directed by the Douglas Brothers was also produced. The title track of the single was written by Christie Hennessy.

Track listing
7" Vinyl & Cassette
"Jealous Heart" (7" version)
"Cití na gCumann"

Compact Disc
"Jealous Heart" (7" version)
"Jealous Heart" (album version)
"Against the Wind"
"Cití na gCumann"

References

1992 singles
1992 songs